Bussu is the name of two communities, one in Hungary, one in France:

 Büssü, in Hungary
 Bussu, in the Somme department